Richard Wilson Stockstill (born December 23, 1957) is an American college football coach. He is the head coach for the Middle Tennessee Blue Raiders football program. Stockstill was a Florida State quarterback under coach Bobby Bowden from 1977 to 1981. On December 12, 2005, Stockstill was hired as the 14th head coach of the Middle Tennessee Blue Raiders.

Early life
Stockstill was born in Sidney, Ohio, on December 23, 1957. However, he grew up in Fernandina Beach, Florida. He was inducted into the Fernandina Hall of Fame in 2006. He attended Florida State University and was a three-year letterman there as a quarterback where he was team captain and earned honorable mention All-America honors in 1981 under coach Bobby Bowden.

Coaching career
Stockstill served as an assistant at numerous locations for 24 years prior to getting his first head coaching job. He began at Bethune–Cookman University as an offensive coordinator and later went on to coach wide receivers at the University of Central Florida. For the 1989 season, Stockstill began a long stint as a wide receivers and quarterbacks coach with the Clemson Tigers, where he stayed until 2002. He served under coaches Danny Ford, Ken Hatfield, Tommy West and Tommy Bowden while at Clemson. Stockstill also worked under coaches Lou Holtz and Steve Spurrier at South Carolina after working one season for East Carolina University as an offensive coordinator.

Middle Tennessee

In 2006, Stockstill got his first head coaching job at Middle Tennessee State University in Murfreesboro. In his first season, Stockstill led the Blue Raiders to the program's second bowl game as well as a share of the Sun Belt Conference title. He was later that year named the conference coach of the year. The 2007 and 2008 seasons saw the Blue Raiders take a small step back with back-to-back 5–7 seasons. However, in 2009, Stockstill and the Blue Raiders went 10–3 and won the New Orleans Bowl, which was the second bowl victory in school history. Again, Stockstill was named conference coach of the year for the 2009 season. The Blue Raiders went to another bowl in 2010, and they finished the season 6–7 after losing the GoDaddy.com Bowl.

After the successful 2009 season, he turned down several offers from other schools, including Conference USA's East Carolina and Memphis, citing that it was not the right time to leave the Blue Raiders. Despite a .500 overall record, Stockstill is 18-60 against teams with eventual winning records, of which a record of 4-28 is coming against non-conference FBS opponents (1-1 against FCS). Stockstill has led MTSU to eight bowl games in 13 years, winning two.

As of the end of the 2021 season, Stockstill is tied with Northwestern's Pat Fitzgerald as the fourth longest-tenured head coach in Division I FBS.

Personal life
Stockstill and his wife, the former Sara Fleischman, have a son, Brent, and a daughter, Emily. His son Brent was awarded a scholarship to play football at the University of Cincinnati beginning in the fall of 2013 but was released to play under his father at MTSU. Brent was the Blue Raiders' primary quarterback for the 2015 through 2018 seasons, culminating with an appearance in the 2018 New Orleans Bowl.

Head coaching record

References

External links
 Middle Tennessee profile

1957 births
Living people
American football quarterbacks
Bethune–Cookman Wildcats football coaches
Clemson Tigers football coaches
East Carolina Pirates football coaches
Florida State Seminoles football players
Middle Tennessee Blue Raiders football coaches
South Carolina Gamecocks football coaches
UCF Knights football coaches
People from Fernandina Beach, Florida
People from Sidney, Ohio
Coaches of American football from Florida
Players of American football from Florida